= Kalepalli, Chittoor district =

Coordinates: 16°45′N 79°34′E

Kalepalli
- Village
- Interactive map of Kalepalli
- Country: India
- State: Andhra Pradesh
- District: Chittoor
- Founder: it is established by " Sree Krishnadevaraya "
- Elevation: 117 m (384 ft)

Population (January 2014)
  - Total: 500

Languages
  - Official: Telugu
- Time zone: UTC+5:30 (IST)
- PIN: 517561
- Vehicle registration: AP-03

Kalepalli is a village in the Indian state of Andhra Pradesh.
